Baat Hamari Pakki Hai is an Indian television drama series which premiered on Sony Entertainment Television on 31 May 2010 and went off air on 25 February 2011.

Plot
Baat Hamaari Pakki Hai is the story of Sanchi, an orphan who lives with her maternal uncle, Indar Sharma (who is a ghar jamai) and Indar's wife, Usha Sharma along with her younger cousins: Shreya, Nani and Nanu. Sanchi faces problems in finding a life partner and keeps getting rejected and Sanchi's marriage becomes the only agenda in Usha's life.

Each time a prospective groom arrives, Sanchi is displayed like a commodity and is often held responsible when the alliance does not work out. She goes through the humiliation of being displayed and then rejected time and again, until one day Sanchi meets her match: Shravan. Sanchi's wedding is fixed with Shravan, but this joy also proves to be short-lived as Sanchi realizes that Shravan loves someone else.

Shravan is shown to be lazy and irresponsible while Sanchi portrays a loving, mature and responsible young woman. The families of the protagonists attempt to solve the issues between the couple. Finally, Sanchi and Shravan get married and decide to make it a contract marriage where they will divorce after six months because Shravan loves Tara.

On their honeymoon, they get drunk and that night sleep together. Tara finds out and dumps him. Later they find out that, that night nothing happened between them. Shravan decides to patch up his relationship with Sanchi. All of the family members try to make Shravan fall for Sanchi. A long while later, Shravan realizes he is in love with Sanchi and confesses his love to her after a romantic session. Sanchi also confesses her love.

Shravan takes the marriage contract and attempts to burn it but realizes he grabbed the wrong paper. The marriage contract ends up in Shravan's father's hands and he is humiliated. However, now that Shravan and Sanchi truly love each other, they are determined to prove their love. Shravan's father makes them divorce and tells Shravan that if he can get  1 lakh in less than 30 days, he will prove himself responsible and that he truly loves Sanchi. Shravan heads out to find a job, but he is unsuccessful.

Shravan gets a job in a garage, working there trying to get 1 lakh. While working, he sees a poster about a race and the winner will get 1 lakh. Shravan enters the race and wins. Sanchi and Shravan go to receive the cheque for 1 lakh. They happily take it and drive away to start a new life. They later realize that it is not a 1 lakh cheque — instead, it's a cheque for  70,000.

Sanchi and Shravan start living in a marriage house, with the names Jack and Jerry. Later, they are accepted back into Shravan's family. But as fate had Sanchi meets with an accident, which erases her memory. In an attempt to get it back, the end result becomes such that Sanchi gets her memory back but forgets everything after 24 hours, which means that each day, she will have to be reminded of her life and her loved ones. Shravan still loves Sanchi despite this condition and the story ends on a good note.

Cast
 Barun Sobti as Shravan Jaiswal-Madhura and Pratap youngest son- youngest brother of Saurabh,and Rajat.Husband of Sanchi.
 Ankita Sharma as Sanchi Shravan Jaiswal
 Krystle D'Souza as Tara (Shravan's first love interest)
 Karan Wahi as Ranveer
 Nupur Joshi as Mandira
 Gaurav Gera as Pappu (Kashmira's brother)
 Kashmera Shah as Pappu's sister
 Vivek Mushran as Inder Sharma (Sanchi's uncle)
 Mona Ambegaonkar as Usha Inder Sharma (Sanchi's aunt)
 Sushil Parashar as Babu Ram Prasad Bhardwaj (Sanchi's Naanu)
 Himani Shivpuri as Nani
 Rohit Bharadwaj as Abhi (Sanchi's cousin-brother)
 Addite Shirwaikar as Preeti (Abhi's wife)
 Khyati Mangla as Shreya (Sanchi's cousin)
 Anokhi Shrivastav as Sharmila (Sanchi's cousin)
 Rishabh Shukla as Pratap Jaiswal- Husband of Madhura.Father of Shravan,Saurabh and Rajat.
 Rajlaxmi Solanki as Madhura Jaiswal-Wife of Pratap Jaiswal.Mother of Shravan, Saurabh, and Rajat.
 Sandeep Rajora as Saurabh Jaiswal-Pratap and Madhura eldest son - eldest brother of Shravan,and Rajat.Husband of Nidhi.
 Sai Deodhar as Nidhi Saurabh Jaiswal (Shravan's eldest sister-in-law)
 Ali Hassan as Rajat Jaiswal-Madhura and Pratap son- younger brother of Saurabh.elder brother of Shravan.Husband of Neeta.
 Mihika Verma as Neeta Rajat Jaiswal (Shravan's elder sister-in-law)
 Renuka Israni as Mrs. Jaiswal (Shravan's grandmother)
 Shaleen Bhanot as Rahul
 Gajendra Chauhan
 Jaya Bhattacharya
 Ragini Khanna
 Priyal Gor
 Jayati Bhatia
 Madhura Naik
 Nishant Shokeen
 Khushwant Walia
 Sahil Sharma as Bunty
 Aishwarya Sakhuja as Tanya (Toasty) Sharma
 Janvi Chheda as Tashi Singh

Awards and nominations

Apsara Film & Television Producers Guild Awards 2011
 Nominated: Best Drama Series Fiction
 Nominated: Best TV Actor - Barun Sobti

References

External links
 Baat Hamari Pakki Hai at Sony Entertainment Television

Sony Entertainment Television original programming
Indian drama television series
2011 Indian television series endings
2010 Indian television series debuts